Peel Fell is the highest hill in the Kielder Forest region of England, making it the highest hill for several miles in each direction until the Cheviot Hills to the north-east are reached. Because of this, it has enough relative height to make it a Marilyn. It lies in both the county of Northumberland and the county of Roxburghshire, which is now governed by the Scottish Borders council, as the summit is on the border with Scotland.

The hill lies in a remote region three miles from the nearest road, surrounded by dense and often impassable forestry plantations.

The Kielder Forest group of hills is large and sprawling. It includes two other Marilyns: Larriston Fells and Sighty Crag.

References

Marilyns of England
Marilyns of Scotland
Hills of Northumberland
Mountains and hills of the Scottish Borders